The women's discus throw event at the 2008 World Junior Championships in Athletics was held in Bydgoszcz, Poland, at Zawisza Stadium on 11 and 13 July.

Medalists

Results

Final
13 July

Qualifications
11 July

Group A

Group B

Participation
According to an unofficial count, 34 athletes from 24 countries participated in the event.

References

Discus throw
Discus throw at the World Athletics U20 Championships
2008 in women's athletics